Chi Chil Tah (also Cheechilgeetho, Gahyazhi, Jones Ranch, Tse Chil Tah) is an unincorporated community in McKinley County, New Mexico, United States.

Education
The Bureau of Indian Affairs operates a K-8 school, Chi Chil'tah Community School. It was given internet access in 2001. That year it had 206 students.

Gallup-McKinley County Schools is the non-BIE school district. Zoned schools are: David Skeet Elementary School in Vanderwagen, Gallup Middle School, and Hiroshi Miyamura High School in Gallup.

Notable person
Chester Nez, last of the original 29 Navajo Code Talkers.

Notes

Unincorporated communities in McKinley County, New Mexico
Unincorporated communities in New Mexico